The House of Holstein-Gottorp, a cadet branch of the Oldenburg dynasty, ruled Sweden between 1751 and 1818, and Norway from 1814 to 1818. 

In 1743, Adolf Frederick of Holstein-Gottorp was elected crown prince of Sweden as a Swedish concession to Russia, a strategy for achieving an acceptable peace after the disastrous war of the same year. He became King of Sweden in 1751.

King Gustav III, Adolf Frederick's eldest son, was enthusiastic that through his great-great-grandmother their dynasty descended from the royal House of Vasa. He expressed wishes that their house be known as Vasa, as the new royal house of Vasa and the continuation of the original. There was no effective way to force this change. Historians have not agreed with Gustav's desires, and the house is always referred to as Holstein-Gottorp.

In 1809, Gustav III's son King Gustav IV Adolf was deposed following the loss of Finland, and the dynasty disappeared from Swedish history with the death of his uncle King Charles XIII in 1818. In 1810, Jean Baptiste Bernadotte (later Charles XIV John), a Marshal of France, was elected crown prince, and became the founder of the next and current Swedish dynasty, the House of Bernadotte.

In 1836, Gustav, the son of the deposed Gustav IV Adolf, was created Prince of Vasa in Austria (written Wasa). However, the use of that name ceased when the prince's only surviving child, his daughter Carola, died without children.

The marriage of the future King Gustaf V to Princess Victoria of Baden in 1881 united the ruling House of Bernadotte with a descendant of the House of Holstein-Gottorp since Victoria was a great-granddaughter of the deposed Gustav IV Adolf.

Kings of Sweden
 1751–1771: Adolf Frederick
 1771–1792: Gustav III
 1792–1809: Gustav IV Adolf
 1809–1818: Charles XIII

King of Norway
 1814–1818: Charles II

External links

Holstein-Gottorp